San Fernando West is a parliamentary electoral district in comprising the western part of the city of San Fernando, Trinidad and Tobago. It came into effect in time for the 1956 Trinidad and Tobago general election.

Members of Parliament 
This constituency has elected the following members of the House of Representatives of Trinidad and Tobago:

Election results

Elections in the 2020s

Elections in the 2010s

References 

 
San Fernando, Trinidad and Tobago